The Suzuki LT500R, also known as the QuadRacer 500, and nicknamed Quadzilla, is a two-stroke  ATV, designed, developed and built by Suzuki, and produced between 1987 and 1990.

References 

ATVs
Suzuki ATVs